Jóhannes Eðvaldsson (3 September 1950 – 24 January 2021) was an Icelandic international football player. He won the Scottish league championship twice with Celtic F.C. and the Scottish Cup once.

Playing career
Jóhannes started his career with Valur in his native land before short spells with Metz of France and Holbek of Denmark. He was signed by Sean Fallon in 1975, joining Scottish club Celtic after a short trial. He played in almost every outfield position while at Celtic but was most suited to central defence. He was nicknamed "Shuggy" by the fans. After making 188 appearances for the Glasgow club, during which he scored 36 goals, Johannes won 2 Premier Division titles and 1 Scottish Cup before he moved to the US in February 1980, joining NASL side Tulsa Roughnecks.

Jóhannes returned to Europe in 1981, joining German side Hannover 96. He later joined Motherwell in 1982 and played two seasons for the Fir Park side before retiring in 1984.

During his career he gained 34 caps for the Iceland national side, 16 of which were attained while with Celtic.

Coaching career
Jóhannes started a coaching career with Þróttur in 1984 but soon returned to live in Scotland, where his wife is from. He suffered a brain haemorrhage in 1995 but made a full recovery. Jóhannes was a coach for a 1994 team at Jimmy Johnstone Academy.

Personal life
Jóhannes' father Evald Mikson was an Estonian international goalkeeper in the 1930s, who was later Deputy Head of the Tallinn Police during the Nazi occupation. Accused of war crimes, Mikson fled Estonia at the end of World War II, eventually alighting in Iceland where he settled and raised a family, changing his name to the Icelandic Eðvald Hinriksson.

Jóhannes' brother Atli, seven years his junior, was also an international footballer. Atli was for a period Iceland's record cap holder, and played most of his career in Germany with Borussia Dortmund, Bayer Uerdingen and Fortuna Düsseldorf before moving into coaching. He managed the Icelandic national side between 2000 and 2003.

Jóhannes died in Glasgow in January 2021. He was 70.

References

1950 births
2021 deaths
Johannes Edvaldsson
Johannes Edvaldsson
Johannes Edvaldsson
FC Metz players
Celtic F.C. players
Hannover 96 players
Motherwell F.C. players
Expatriate footballers in Germany
North American Soccer League (1968–1984) players
Tulsa Roughnecks (1978–1984) players
Cape Town City F.C. (NFL) players
Scottish Football League players
2. Bundesliga players
Expatriate footballers in Scotland
Johannes Edvaldsson
Expatriate footballers in France
Expatriate soccer players in South Africa
Johannes Edvaldsson
Expatriate soccer players in the United States
Icelandic expatriate sportspeople in the United States
Icelandic expatriate sportspeople in Denmark
Icelandic expatriate sportspeople in Germany
Association football central defenders
Expatriate men's footballers in Denmark
Johannes Edvaldsson
Holbæk B&I players
National Football League (South Africa) players